Filmworks XX: Sholem Aleichem features a score for film by John Zorn. The album was released on Zorn's own label, Tzadik Records, in 2008 and contains music that Zorn wrote and recorded for a documentary on the 19th century Jewish writer Sholem Aleichem.

Reception

The Allmusic review by Thom Jurek awarded the album 4 stars stating "Musically, this project, for being centered on the folk themes from Eastern European Jewry, dating as early as the 18th century, is also wonderfully modern and diverse... The music here is accessible, evocative, and yes, as is almost always the case for Zorn, thoroughly engaging".

Track listing
All compositions by John Zorn
 "Shalom, Sholem!" - 2:11  
 "Luminous Visions" - 4:12  
 "Mamme Loshen" - 3:18  
 "Beyond the Pale" - 2:25  
 "Mekubolim" - 4:36  
 "Portable Homeland" - 4:06  
 "Wandering Star" - 3:19  
 "Jewish Revolutionaries" - 4:59  
 "Shtetls" - 3:02  
 "Lucky Me, I'm an Orphan!" - 3:47  
 "Nicht Gefährlich" - 3:42  
 "Talking Through Oblivion" - 4:46

Personnel
Mark Feldman - violin
Carol Emanuel - harp
Rob Burger - accordion
Erik Friedlander - cello
Greg Cohen - bass

References

Tzadik Records soundtracks
Albums produced by John Zorn
John Zorn soundtracks
2008 soundtrack albums
Film scores